Khormayak (also Romanized as Khormāyak; also known as Khūmrīak) is a village in Aviz Rural District, in the Central District of Farashband County, Fars Province, Iran. At the 2006 census, its population was 604, in 127 families.

References 

Populated places in Farashband County